Georg Kaspar Nagler (January 6, 1801 in Obersüßbach – January 20, 1866 in Munich) was a German art historian and art writer.

Life and work 
Georg Kaspar Nagler, who came from a poor background studied from 1815 at the Wilhelmsgymnasium, Munich (today).  From 1823 he studied philology and natural sciences at the local lyceum, finally receiving in 1829 a doctorate to become Dr. phil. at the University of Erlangen. Already since 1827 he was owner of a second-hand bookshop, after he married the bookshop owner's widow Johanna Ehrentreich. He became an employee of the  Bayerische National-Zeitung, published by Joseph Heinrich Wolf.

His New General Artist Lexicon, appeared in 1835–1852 in 22 volumes. For this he received gold medals for art and science from Duke Max in Bayern and Friedrich Wilhelm IV of Prussia. It was largely based on the General Artist Lexicon by Rudolf Füssli (1709–1793).

Publications (selection) 

 De Rhapsodis.Thesis, 1829.
 Eight days in Munich. Franz, Munich 1834 (reprint of the edition of 1863: Gerber, Munich 1983).
 History of the porcelain manufactory to Munich. Munich 1834 (also in: Bavarian Annals, Abth. Vaterlandskunde, 1834, No. 34-38).
 New general artist lexicon or news from the life and works of painters, sculptors, master builders, engravers, trimmers, lithographers, draftsmen, medalists, ivory workers, etc. 22 volumes. Publisher of E. A. Fleischmann, Munich 1835–1852 (total 12,500 pages).
 Rafael as a human being and artist. Publisher of E. A. Fleischmann, Munich 1836.
 Michel-Angelo Buonarotti as an artist. Publisher of E. A. Fleischmann, Munich 1836.
 Albrecht Dürer and his art. Publisher of E. A. Fleischmann, Munich 1837. 
 Life and works of Marco-Antonio Raimondi from Bologna. 1842. 
 Life and Works of the Painter and Rader Rembrandt van Ryn. Munich 1843.
 Contributions to the older topography of Munich. 1847–1850; 2nd edition as topographical history of Munich and its suburbs. Franz, Munich 1863.
 The Monogrammists and those known and unknown artists of all schools who are called to designate their works of a figurative sign, the initials of the name, the Abbreviatur of the same & c. have served. 5 volumes plus general index. G. Franz, Munich 1858–1863,  (Volúmenes 4 y 5 a título póstumo, 15,000 monogramas de 12,000 artistas).

Literature

External links

References 

1801 births
1866 deaths
German art historians
People from Landshut (district)
Writers from Bavaria